Penicillium janczewskii is an anamorph and filamentous species of the genus of Penicillium which was isolated from the rhizosphere of Vernonia herbacea. Penicillium janczewskii produces griseofulvin

Further reading

References

janczewskii
Fungi described in 1927